The American militia movement is a term used by law enforcement and security analysts to refer to a number of private organizations that include paramilitary or similar elements. These groups may refer to themselves as militia, unorganized militia, and constitutional militia. While groups such as the Posse Comitatus existed as early as the 1980s, the movement gained momentum after standoffs with government agents in the early 1990s. By the mid-1990s, such groups were active in all 50 US states, with membership estimated at between 10,000 and 250,000.

History
Although the far-right patriot movement had long been a fringe factor in American politics, cultural factors paved the way for the wide-scale growth of the ideological militia movement. The catalysts came with the FBI's 1992 shootout with Randy Weaver at Ruby Ridge, and the 1993 Waco siege involving David Koresh and the Branch Davidians at Mt. Carmel in Waco, Texas. Critic Mark Pitcavage described the militia movement of the 1990s:

During the 1990s public attention to the militia movement began to grow. The Oklahoma City bombing on April 19, 1995, the second anniversary of the Waco fire, drew nationwide attention to the militia movement as Timothy McVeigh was associated with the Michigan Militia, having possibly attended meetings before the attack. This increased public scrutiny and law enforcement pressure, and brought in more recruits due to the heightened awareness of the movement.

In March 1996, agents of the FBI and other law enforcement organizations surrounded the  eastern Montana "Justus Township" compound of the Montana Freemen. The Freemen were a Sovereign Citizen group that included elements of the Christian Identity ideology, espoused common law legal theories, and rejected the legitimacy of the Federal Reserve. Montana legislator Carl Ohs mediated through the standoff. Both Randy Weaver (one of the besieged at Ruby Ridge) and Bo Gritz (a civilian negotiator at Ruby Ridge) had attempted to talk to the group but had given up in frustration, as did Colorado Senator Charlie Duke when he had attempted negotiations. A break finally came when far right leaders abandoned the group to their fate. The group surrendered peacefully after an 81-day standoff and 14 of the Freemen faced criminal charges relating to circulating millions of dollars in bogus checks and threatening the life of a federal judge. The peaceful resolution of this and other standoffs after Ruby Ridge and Waco have been credited by some to the creation of the Critical Incident Response Group (CIRG) in the U.S. Department of Justice in 1994.

A 1999 US Department of Justice analysis of the potential militia threat at the millennium conceded that the vast majority of militias were reactive (not proactive) and posed no threat. By 2001, the militia movement seemed to be in decline, having peaked in 1996 with 858 groups. With the post-2007 global financial crisis and the election of Barack Obama to the United States presidency in 2008, militia activity experienced a resurgence. Militia groups have recently been involved in several high-profile standoffs, including the Bundy Standoff in 2014 and the Occupation of the Malheur National Wildlife Refuge in 2016.

Many militia groups, particularly those on the far-right, strongly supported the candidacy and presidency of Donald Trump, with their focus on anti-government sentiment being replaced with opposing perceived enemies of Trump who were often alleged to be deeply imbedded within the bureaucracy or "deep state". During Trump's presidency, support amongst certain militia groups and members wained in some instances but solidified and expanded in others. Starting in 2020, militia groups were heavily involved in rallies against COVID-19 related restrictions, gun control measures, and Black Lives Matter protests. After Trump's loss in the 2020 presidential election, militia groups who had supported Trump mobilized to protest the results, including large scale participation in the "Stop The Steal" movement, promoting false claims that the election result was fraudulent.

In the storming of the US Capitol on January 6, 2021, members with ties to various militia groups participated in the attack. In recent years, there have been increasing incidents in which Republicans candidates for public office pandering to militia groups in exchange for their support.

Legal legitimacy

Most militia organizations envisage themselves as legally legitimate organizations, despite the fact that all 50 states prohibit private paramilitary activity. Others subscribe to the "insurrection theory" which describes the right of the body politic to rebel against the established government in the face of tyranny. (In the 1951 case Dennis v. United States, the U.S. Supreme Court rejected the insurrection theory, stating that as long as the government provides for free elections and trials by jury, "political self-defense" cannot be undertaken.)

Opposition to the government

While militia organizations vary in their ideologies and objectives, with many high profile organizations espousing anti-tax, anti-immigration, survivalist, sovereign citizen, libertarian, land rights and southern restoration views, they generally share a common belief in the imminent or actual rise of a tyrannical government in the United States which, they believe, must be confronted through armed force. Some believe in the New World Order conspiracy theory.

Active militia groups

The Southern Poverty Law Center identified 334 militia groups at a peak in 2011. It identified 276 in 2015, up from 202 in 2014 and in 2022 nearly 200 groups still exist, down from 2015.

Constitutionalists 

The constitutionalist wing of the American militia movement became active in the mid 1990s in a response of outrage about the violent confrontation at Ruby Ridge, the Waco Siege and gun control legislation. The movement is composed largely of veterans, libertarians, and Second Amendment advocates who share a common belief in individual liberties and civil responsibilities, according to their interpretation of the U.S. Constitution, as well as disdain for what are perceived to be abusive, usurpative, or tyrannical federal government decisions and actions, and a set of ideals associated with the values of the militia they see embodied in the Constitution. From the inception of the modern movement there has been controversy over whether the movement was an important part of a complete response to many important threats, or a threat in itself.

Scholars Stanley C. Weeber and Daniel G. Rodeheaver offer a description of the constitutionalist militia movement that identifies four types:
 The Open Constitutionalist, with the Cascade Brigade as an example
 Constitutionalist/Command Structure, with the Alabama Constitutional Militia and the Michigan Militia as examples
 Constitutionalist/Cell Structure, with the Militia of Montana and the Texas Constitutional Militia as examples
 Underground/ No Public Contact, with the Sons of Liberty (Alabama) as example

Other writers view constitutionalism as the movement, having a militia wing, rather than a militia movement with a constitutionalist wing.

Throughout American history, there have been other constitutionalist revivals in opposition to various government actions. Some writers have asserted that the modern revival of the constitutional militia movement began as early as 1958 but that, in this early phase, it was associated ideologically with the white supremacist Christian Identity movement mixed with constitutionalist elements. A fear of Communism was prevalent in the United States during the Twentieth Century, against which was set the modern revival of the constitutional militia movement. These militia revivals believed in the sanctity of the U.S. Constitution, and that certain groups are conspiring to destroy America. Unlike the Christian Identity groups, the Constitutionalist militias generally resist casting blame on ethnic, racial or religious groups, but rather blame influential individuals or groups of individuals (e.g., the Bilderberg Group, the Trilateral Commission) who promote globalization, collectively known as the New World Order. The Posse Comitatus is an exception to this principle, however, as it adheres to the antisemitic theory of the Zionist Occupation Government.

Conceptually, a citizen's militia has been defined as a constitutionalist private army meeting regularly to practice combat skills and discuss weapons. The militia is defined as social groups practice "skills within a distinct territory, are not always anti-government, and have some opinions regarding use of terrorism to further militia goals." It may have an offensive, paramilitary, and/or defensive orientation depending on circumstances.

Operational features listed in the book Militias in the New Millennium include the following:
Training in combat scenarios and weaponry skills in mock actions and maneuvers
Has an identifiable territory in which members reside
Bases organization philosophies on anti-government rhetoric
Development of contingency plans in case of governmental provocation
Considers bombing, kidnappings, separatism, "paper terrorism", or other extreme measures to protect the organic Constitution
Considers the viability of criminal activity to acquire weapons and explosives

See also
Domestic terrorism in the United States
Second American Civil War
Guerrilla warfare
Leaderless resistance
Minutemen
Private military company
List of private military contractors
Second American Revolution
 Christian Patriot movement
 Ranch Rescue
 Tea Party movement
 White Terror
 Antifa

References

Further reading
 

Political movements in the United States
Terrorism in the United States
 
Paleoconservatism
Far-right terrorism